City’super, stylised in logos as "c!ty'super" (the company name is City Super Limited), is a retail chain in Hong Kong and Taiwan. Positioned as a mega lifestyle specialty store, its core format of upmarket supermarkets sell primarily fresh produce and groceries. The Company also operates LOG-ON which offer stationery, cosmetics, gadgets, fashion accessories and travel goods. It also operates food court business called cookedDeli. city’super specialises in upmarket specialist products and premium imported groceries, which differentiates it from other supermarkets that operate across Greater China. As of June 2018,  the Company has 23 stores in Hong Kong, 10 in Shanghai and 8 in Taiwan under the 3 brands.

Cultural impact
city’super specialises in imported produce and goods and holds regular thematic promotional events to popularise its imported goods such as Taiwan Fair, Sake Fair, Cheese Fair, Seafood & Sparling Fair.

The chain has been called "elitist" with its premium and unique selection of specialist produce. Its high-end fruit is a popular choice for gift-giving especially during festivals and celebrations.

Ownership
city’super is majority owned by Fenix Group, with Wharf Group being the other key shareholder.

References

External links

 city'super Hong Kong

Retail companies established in 1996
Supermarkets of Hong Kong
Supermarkets of Taiwan
Supermarkets of China
1986 establishments in Hong Kong